Saxon War may refer to:
Saxon Wars (late 8th century)
Saxon Rebellion (1073–75)
Great Saxon Revolt (1077–88)